Wahid Shams-Kolahi (Persian: وحید شمس کلاهی) is a scientist and an electrical engineer who is known for his research in photovoltaic-related technologies.

Dr. Shams-Kolahi was born in Arak, Iran, in 1965. He obtained his undergraduate degree in electrical engineering at University of Stuttgart and joined the graduate school of electrical engineering/electrophysics, led by Professor Werner H. Bloss. He worked under Professor Bloss with the Institute of Physical Electronics, IPE, and later joined the Hamakawa Lab of the Graduate School of Electrical Engineering, Faculty of Engineering Science, Osaka University, Japan, where he obtained his master's degree in 1994 and his Ph.D. in 1997.

While at Hamakawa Lab, Wahid Shams-Kolahi conducted research on space-made materials and their potential for applications such as the absorption layer of solar cells. The team at Hamakawa Lab led by Shams-Kolahi was chosen by the Spacelab Mission Endeavour project, a cooperation between NASA of the United States and the Japanese NASDA, to study the electrical and optical properties of SiAsTe amorphous- or chalcogenide semiconductors fabricated under microgravity in space as part of Endeavour mission STS-47.

Wahid has initiated and conducted research in solid-state electronics and the manufacture of thin-film solar cells such as amorphous silicon, CIGS and CdTe.

Notable projects
 Doping efficiency/doping effect on the electrical conductivity of amorphous semiconductors prepared in the space shuttle microgravity (Osaka University, Japan)
 Novel Purification Techniques for Semiconductors (Si) and Insulators (PRISED Solar Inc. & Centre for Advanced Nanotechnology, University of Toronto, Canada)
 Optimization of epitaxy of ultra-thin platinum silicide (Mitsubishi Electric, Amagasaki, Japan)
 Differential methods and the calculation of semiconductor band gaps (Osaka University, Japan)
 Physical vapor deposition for co-evaporation of CIGS thin-film solar cells (Panasonic, Matsushita Denki, Kyoto, Japan)
 SLG-substrate softening temperature related to the formation of CIGS thin films (Panasonic, Matsushita Denki, Kyoto, Japan)
 Use of PVD for Light Amplification by nanocrystalline silicon sensitized erbium-doped silica (University of Toronto, Canada)
 Utilization of TOF-SIMS for the Characterization and identification of Si-Nanocrystals (University of Toronto, Canada)
 Simultaneous Improvement of electrical and optical properties of TCO (ITO) thin films (University of Toronto, Canada)

Selected publications

References

1965 births
Living people
Osaka University alumni